Grady Herbert Wilson (November 23, 1922 – July 23, 2003) was a professional baseball player. He played part of one season in Major League Baseball, appearing in 12 games for the Pittsburgh Pirates in 1948, primarily as a shortstop. He also had an extensive career in minor league baseball, spanning fourteen years from 1946–59, and then as a manager until 1966.

External links

Major League Baseball shortstops
Pittsburgh Pirates players
Milford Red Sox players
Houston Buffaloes players
Allentown Cardinals players
New Orleans Pelicans (baseball) players
Greenville Spinners players
Montreal Royals players
Indianapolis Indians players
St. Paul Saints (AA) players
Mobile Bears players
Montgomery Rebels players
Montgomery Grays players
Charleston Rebels players
Jacksonville Braves players
Little Rock Travelers players
Shreveport Sports players
Minor league baseball managers
Troy Trojans baseball players
Baseball players from Georgia (U.S. state)
1922 births
2003 deaths